Dominate is the third album by French progressive metal band Adagio. It was produced by Stéphan Forté and Kevin Codfert and mixed at House of Audio Studios in Germany by Dennis Ward.  It is the first and only Adagio album to feature Gus Monsanto on vocals.

Track listing 

"Fire Forever" – 4:11
"Dominate" – 5:59
"Terror Jungle" – 5:15
"Children of the Dead Lake" – 6:04
"R'lyeh the Dead" – 8:25
"The Darkitecht" – 6:18
"Kissing the Crow" – 2:28
"Fame" (Irene Cara cover) – 4:01
"Undying" (US bonus track) – 4:34

Personnel 
Gus Monsanto – vocals
Stéphan Forté – guitar
Franck Hermanny – bass
Kevin Codfert – keyboards
Eric Lébailly – drums

Charts

References

2005 albums
Adagio (band) albums